A swindler is generally a  charlatan, a person practicing quackery, fraud, or similar confidence trick in order to obtain money, property, or advantage by pretense.

People
 Swindler (surname), list of people with this name

Media
The Swindler (novel) (Spanish: El Buscón), 1604 
The Swindler, novel by Ethel M. Dell
The Swindler (film), 1919 British silent drama film based on the story by Ethel M. Dell
The Swinder, Swedish documentary by Jon Ekstrand
The Swindlers, re-release title for the 1946 film White Tie and Tails
The Swindlers (1963 film), 1963 Italian comedy film
The Swindlers (2017 film), Korean action film
Swindler, a fictional character, and toy in the Micromasters line

See also
Swindle (disambiguation)